Mount Cavaney is a peak,  high, rising just north of the head of Capsize Glacier in the Deep Freeze Range, Victoria Land. It was named by the Northern Party of the New Zealand Geological Survey Antarctic Expedition, 1965–66, for R.J. Cavaney, geologist with that party.

References
 

Mountains of Victoria Land
Scott Coast